Leandro Emmanuel Martínez (born 4 June 1994) is an Argentine footballer who plays for América Mineiro. Mainly a left winger, he can also play as an attacking midfielder.

Personal life
Born in Tandil, Martínez lost his father at the age of just eight due to a lung cancer.

Club career

River Plate
Martínez was a River Plate youth graduate, having joined their youth setup at the age of 13. He then spent some time with the club's reserve team, scoring in the Superclásico against the reserve side of Boca Juniors in 2014.

Loan to San Martín de San Juan
On 12 February 2015, Martínez moved to Primera División side San Martín de San Juan on loan for one year. He made his professional debut on 4 May, starting and scoring the winner in a 1–0 away success over Temperley.

On 19 January 2016, Martínez renewed his loan deal with San Martín for a further 18 months. However, he failed to establish himself as a starter for the club, and left in 2017.

Loan to Chacarita Juniors
On 25 August 2017, Martínez agreed to a one-year loan deal with Chacarita Juniors, also in the top tier. He scored just once in 11 league appearances for the club, as his side suffered relegation.

Deportivo Cuenca
On 3 July 2018, Martínez moved abroad after being announced at Ecuadorian Serie A side Deportivo Cuenca. He impressed during the 2019 season after providing 14 assists and scoring seven goals.

Barcelona SC
On 27 December 2019, Martínez was announced as the new signing of Barcelona SC, after agreeing to a one-year loan contract. An immediate starter, he signed a permanent three-year deal with the club on 11 January 2021.

Career statistics

Honours
Barcelona SC
Ecuadorian Serie A: 2020

References

External links

1994 births
Living people
People from Tandil
Sportspeople from Buenos Aires Province
Association football wingers
Argentine footballers
Argentine expatriate footballers
Argentine Primera División players
Ecuadorian Serie A players
Campeonato Brasileiro Série A players
San Martín de San Juan footballers
Chacarita Juniors footballers
Barcelona S.C. footballers
C.D. Cuenca footballers
América Futebol Clube (MG) players
Argentine expatriate sportspeople in Ecuador
Argentine expatriate sportspeople in Brazil
Expatriate footballers in Ecuador
Expatriate footballers in Brazil